Juan Vildo Marin, otherwise known as Vildo Marin (born March 9, 1959 in Corozal Town, Corozal District, Belize) is a Belizean politician and People's United Party member. He represented Corozal Bay, which includes Corozal Town, in the House of Representatives of Belize.

Marin is married. He has a B.A. from the Southeastern Louisiana University. He was elected to the House in 1989 from Corozal Bay and has been reelected in every election since then. As of 2007, he holds the positions Minister for Agriculture and Fisheries and Deputy Prime Minister under Said Musa's government.

References 

1959 births
Living people
People from Corozal Town
People's United Party politicians
Government ministers of Belize
Deputy Prime Ministers of Belize
Members of the Belize House of Representatives for Corozal Bay